John Benson Sebastian  (born March 17, 1944) is an American singer-songwriter, guitarist and harmonicist who founded the rock band The Lovin' Spoonful. He made an impromptu appearance at the Woodstock festival in 1969 and scored a U.S. No. 1 hit in 1976 with "Welcome Back."

Sebastian was inducted into the Rock and Roll Hall of Fame in 2000 as a member of the Lovin' Spoonful.

Early life
Sebastian was born in New York City and grew up in Italy and Greenwich Village. His father, John Sebastian ( John Sebastian Pugliese), was a noted classical harmonica player, and his mother, Jane (born Mary Jane Bishir), was a radio script writer. His godmother was Vivian Vance ("Ethel Mertz" of I Love Lucy), who was a close friend of his mother. His godfather and first babysitter was children's book illustrator Garth Williams, a friend of his father. Eleanor Roosevelt was a neighbor who lived across the hall.

Sebastian grew up surrounded by music and musicians, including Burl Ives and Woody Guthrie, and hearing such players as Lead Belly and Mississippi John Hurt in his own neighborhood. He graduated from Blair Academy, a private boarding school in Blairstown, New Jersey, in 1962. He next attended New York University for just over a year, but dropped out as he became more interested in musical pursuits.

Early career
In the early 1960s, Sebastian developed an interest in blues music and in playing harmonica in a blues style, rather than the classical style of his father. Through his father's connections, he met and was influenced by blues musicians Sonny Terry and Lightnin' Hopkins (for whom Sebastian served as "unofficial tour guide and valet" when Hopkins was in New York City). Sebastian became part of the folk and blues scene that was developing in Greenwich Village, which in part later gave rise to folk rock.

In addition to harmonica, Sebastian played guitar and occasionally autoharp. One of Sebastian's first recording gigs was playing guitar and harmonica for Billy Faier's 1964 album The Beast of Billy Faier. He also played on Fred Neil's album Bleecker & MacDougal and Tom Rush's self-titled album in 1965. He played in the Even Dozen Jug Band and in The Mugwumps, which split to form the Lovin' Spoonful and the Mamas & the Papas. Bob Dylan invited him to play bass on his Bringing It All Back Home sessions (though Sebastian's parts probably did not appear on the album) and to join Dylan's new electric touring band, but Sebastian declined in order to concentrate on his own project, the Lovin' Spoonful.

The Lovin' Spoonful

Sebastian was joined by Zal Yanovsky, Steve Boone, and Joe Butler in the Spoonful, which was named after "The Coffee Blues," a Mississippi John Hurt song. The Lovin' Spoonful, which blended folk-rock and pop with elements of blues, country, and jug band music, became part of the American response to the British Invasion, and was noted for such hits as "Do You Believe in Magic", "Jug Band Music", "You Didn't Have to Be So Nice", "Daydream", "Did You Ever Have to Make Up Your Mind?", "Summer in the City", "Rain on the Roof", "Nashville Cats", "Darling Be Home Soon", and "Six O'Clock".

The band, however, began to implode after a 1967 marijuana bust in San Francisco involving Yanovsky, a Canadian citizen. Facing deportation, he revealed the name of his dealer to police, which caused a fan backlash and added to the internal tension already created by the band members' diverging interests. Neither Sebastian nor Butler was involved in the matter, both being away from San Francisco at the time. Yanovsky subsequently left the band and was replaced by Jerry Yester, after which the band's musical style veered away from its previous eclectic blend and became more pop-oriented.

Sebastian left the Lovin' Spoonful in 1968 and did not play with any later versions of the band, except for a brief reunion with the other three original members to appear in Paul Simon's 1980 film One-Trick Pony, and again for a single performance at their Rock and Roll Hall of Fame induction ceremony in 2000.

Solo career 1960s–1970s

Broadway musical composer
One of Sebastian's first projects after leaving the Spoonful was composing the music and lyrics for a play with music, Jimmy Shine, written by Murray Schisgal. It opened on Broadway in December 1968, with Dustin Hoffman in the title role, and ran until April 1969, for a total of over 150 performances.<ref>Bordman, Gerald. [https://books.google.com/books?id=cET0eE7j5o4C&pg=PA429 Theatre: A Chronicle of Comedy and Drama, 1930–1969.] Oxford Univ. Press, 1996, p. 429. .</ref>The total number of Jimmy Shine performances reported varies: Pollock reports 166 performances, compared to 161 by Playbill Vault and 153 by Bordman. In the late 1970s and early 1980s, Sebastian himself wrote a stage musical adaptation of E.B. White's Charlotte's Web in consultation with his godfather Garth Williams, who illustrated White's original book. The proposed musical included 20 songs, some of which Sebastian performed in concert, but the musical was never produced."Sha Na Na Revisits the 50s and 60s", The New York Times, March 13, 1981, archived at NYTimes.com.  Retrieved June 8, 2015.

Woodstock appearance
In August 1969, Sebastian made an unscheduled appearance at Woodstock. He traveled to the festival as a spectator, but was asked to appear when the organizers suddenly needed an acoustic performer after a rain break because they couldn't set up amps on stage for Santana until the water was swept off. Sources that have tried to reconstruct the Woodstock running order differ on the exact time and position of Sebastian's unplanned set, with some stating that he played on Saturday, August 16, immediately after Country Joe McDonald;Perone, James E. Woodstock: An Encyclopedia of the Music and Art Fair. Greenwood Press, 2005, p. 43.  others saying that on that Saturday, Santana followed McDonald and Sebastian appeared after Santana;Graff, Gary, "Woodstock Box Set Unearths Famous Festival's Rarities", Billboard, billboard.com, June 5, 2009. Retrieved June 4, 2015. and still others, including McDonald, recalling that Sebastian actually played on Friday, August 15, at some point after Richie Havens opened the festival.McDonald, Joe, "Country Joe's Place: Woodstock's 40th Anniversary: 'If you can remember the 60s ...'", countryjoe.com. Retrieved June 5, 2015.Fornatale, Pete. Back to the Garden: The Story of Woodstock. Touchstone, 2009, p. 49–50. .

Sebastian's Woodstock set consisted of three songs from his recorded but not yet released John B. Sebastian album ("How Have You Been", "I Had a Dream", and "Rainbows All Over Your Blues") and two Lovin' Spoonful songs ("Darling Be Home Soon" and "Younger Generation", which he dedicated to a newborn baby at the festival). Documentary remarks by festival organizers indicated that Sebastian was under the influence of marijuana or other psychedelic drugsLittleproud, Brad, and Joanne Hague. Woodstock: Peace, Music and Memories. Krause Publications, 2009, p. 81. . at the time, hence his spontaneity and casual, unplanned set. Sebastian has confirmed in later interviews that he was a regular marijuana user at the time and had taken acid at Woodstock because he was not scheduled to perform.Bermant, Charles, "John Sebastian's Spoonful of Magic", originally published at sonicboomers.com, March 26, 2010, archived at archive.org, March 27, 2010. Retrieved June 3, 2015. However, he has also noted that "there was a natural high there [at Woodstock]," and that "[i]n an interview it is the easy thing to say 'yeah, I was really high,' but it was actually a very small part of the event. In fact, I had a small part of some pill that someone gave me before I went on stage, but it wasn't a real acid feeling." Sebastian appeared on the original Woodstock album and in the documentary film. Twenty-five years later, he returned for Woodstock '94, playing harmonica for Crosby, Stills and Nash and appearing with his own band, the J-Band.

In September 1969, a month after Woodstock, Sebastian performed a similar set of solo and Spoonful material at the 1969 Big Sur Folk Festival and was featured in the subsequent documentary Celebration at Big Sur (1971).Greenspun, Roger, "Movie Review: Celebration at Big Sur (1971): Familiar Songs: 'Celebration at Big Sur' Depicts Pop Festival," The New York Times, April 10, 1971, archived at nytimes.com. Retrieved June 5, 2015.

Major-label solo recordings
In January 1970, Sebastian released the first in a series of solo LPs on Reprise Records (a label owned by Warner Bros. Records), his eponymous solo debut, John B. Sebastian, on which he was accompanied by various Los Angeles musicians including Crosby, Stills & Nash. It was Sebastian's highest-charting solo album, reaching No. 20 in the Billboard album charts. In a contract dispute with MGM Records, MGM, without authorization from Sebastian or his management, also released the John B. Sebastian album, under a different cover, and a live album, John Sebastian Live; both were later withdrawn from the market. Sebastian's second Reprise album, Cheapo Cheapo Productions Presents Real Live John Sebastian, was hastily recorded in an effort to provide an authorized live album.Unterberger, Richie, "Liner Notes for John Sebastian's 'Cheapo Cheapo Productions Presents Real Live'" (Collector's Choice Music reissue CD), richieunterberger.com. Retrieved June 5, 2015.

For his third Reprise album, The Four of Us (1971), Sebastian used a core backing band consisting of keyboardist Paul Harris, drummer Dallas Taylor and bassist Kenny Altman. He considered forming a permanent band with them, but Harris and Taylor chose to join Stephen Stills's band Manassas. In 1972, Sebastian also released a non-LP single, "Give Us a Break" b/w "Music for People Who Don't Speak English", which did not chart. On his next album, Tarzana Kid (1974), Sebastian returned to using a rotating group of well-known recording artists and session musicians, including Lowell George (who also co-wrote, with Sebastian, the album track "Face of Appalachia"), Phil Everly, Emmylou Harris, the Pointer Sisters, David Grisman, Russell DaShiell, Ry Cooder and Buddy Emmons. Sebastian, George and Everly also briefly considered forming a supergroup but abandoned the idea.Fong-Torres, Ben. Willin': The Story of Little Feat. Perseus, 2013, p. 81–82.

Sebastian has stated that his musical career suffered in the early 1970s from being out of step with the trends set by emerging artists such as Alice Cooper, and that he made more money by buying and selling real estate than he did from his music. After Tarzana Kid failed to chart, Sebastian sought a release from his Reprise contract, which required him to make one more album. However, in 1976, Sebastian had an unexpected No. 1 single with "Welcome Back", the theme song to the sitcom Welcome Back, Kotter, causing the label to rush the production of an album, also titled Welcome Back. Despite the "monster hit" status of the song "Welcome Back", Sebastian expressed frustration that Reprise did not do more to promote the associated album, his last for Reprise.Unterberger, Richie, "Liner Notes for John Sebastian's 'Welcome Back'" (Collector's Choice Music reissue CD), richieunterberger.com. Retrieved June 5, 2015. His later albums have been released primarily on independent record labels. The song, Sebastian's only top-40 solo hit, found new life 28 years later when a sample from it became the hook for rapper Mase's 2004 hit "Welcome Back".

In 2001, Rhino Entertainment re-released all five of Sebastian's Reprise albums, plus the non-LP "Give Us a Break" single, on CD in a limited-edition box set entitled Faithful Virtue: The Reprise Recordings. The box set also included live recordings of Sebastian's entire Woodstock performance and six previously unreleased songs recorded in mono from a performance at the Winterland Ballroom in San Francisco on October 4, 1969. In 2006, Sebastian's five Reprise albums were reissued as individual CDs by Collectors' Choice Music, with new liner notes by Richie Unterberger.

Session work
During the 1960s and 1970s, Sebastian guested on a number of recordings by other artists. He played harmonica with the Doors on the song "Roadhouse Blues" (from the album Morrison Hotel), under the pseudonym G. Pugliese to avoid problems with his contract and to avoid association with Jim Morrison, who was then facing trial on charges of lewd behavior after the Miami concert incident. He also appeared on two Doors live albums, playing on "Little Red Rooster" on  Alive, She Cried and on seven songs on Live in Detroit.[ Allmusic entry for The Doors Live in Detroit]. Retrieved January 6, 2009. Both albums were later re-released, remastered, and repackaged into one single album, In Concert, and included Morrison's introduction of Sebastian to the stage on the "Little Red Rooster" track.

Sebastian is credited with playing three instruments on the 1970 Gordon Lightfoot album,  Sit Down Young Stranger (Reprise RS 6392). He played autoharp on "Saturday Clothes", electric guitar on "Baby It's Allright", and harmonica on "The Pony Man". The album was later retitled If You Could Read My Mind when the song of that name unexpectedly became a major hit.

Sebastian is credited with playing harmonica on Crosby, Stills, Nash & Young's song "Déjà Vu" from the album of the same name. He had previously been asked by Crosby, Stills & Nash to join their group as a fourth member, but turned them down, leading to their association with Neil Young. In 1977 he recorded as part of Artie and Happy Traum's Woodstock Mountain Revue (a.k.a. Woodstock Mountains) folk collaboration for the album More Music From Mud Acres.Heppner, Richard, and Janine Fallon-Mower. Legendary Locals of Woodstock. Arcadia Publishing, 2013, p. 42. . Other records on which Sebastian appeared include the album Stephen Stills (1970), Timothy Leary's album You Can Be Anyone This Time Around (1970) (on which Sebastian jammed with Jimi Hendrix),"Timothy Leary's 'Dangerous' Psychedelic Album: You Can Be Anyone This Time Around 1970", fromthebarrelhouse.com, September 25, 2013. Retrieved June 7, 2015. and Keith Moon's only solo album, Two Sides of the Moon (1975). He also played the autoharp instrumental break between the second and third verses of Randy VanWarmer's 1979 hit "Just When I Needed You Most".

Later career

Since the 1980s, Sebastian has been active in several music-related areas, not only writing and performing his own material but also performing roots music, developing soundtrack and instructional material, hosting and appearing on television programs, and writing a children's book about a harmonica-playing bear.

Live performances
Sebastian has continued to tour and play live, both solo and with a variety of backing bands. He had a long association with the eclectic rock band NRBQ, dating back to the early 1980s, when he played on NRBQ's album Grooves in Orbit (1983). He has said that NRBQ "to a large extent, picked up where The Lovin' Spoonful left off" because of NRBQ's "wide range of musical styles that they're not only able but accurate at playing," and he expressed appreciation for NRBQ's support during a low point in his career. In turn, Sebastian helped NRBQ by using them on his own Nelvana and Disney Channel soundtrack projects during a period when litigation prevented them from recording. Sebastian has used NRBQ as his own backing band, appeared regularly at their concerts,Catlin, Roger, "It's NRBQ's Time at Toad's", Hartford Courant, November 25, 1999, archived at courant.com. Retrieved June 7, 2015. and recorded frequently with the band members, and NRBQ founding member Terry Adams refers to Sebastian as an "honorary member" of the band. Although he performed Lovin' Spoonful songs solo and with NRBQ (who were themselves promoted in the 1980s as "the new Lovin' Spoonful"), he declined to reunite with several former Spoonful members in 1991.

Throughout the 1990s, Sebastian frequently appeared with the J-Band, a jug band including Fritz Richmond from the Jim Kweskin Jug Band, jug band pioneer Yank Rachell, Jimmy Vivino, and Geoff Muldaur. Sebastian and the J-Band were featured in Chasin' Gus' Ghost (2007), a documentary about the roots and influence of jug band music.IMDB entry for Chasin' Gus' Ghost documentary. The film screened in August 2007 at the San Francisco Jug Band Festival (where Sebastian performed with other musicians featured in the film, including Geoff Muldaur, Maria Muldaur, Jim Kweskin and David Grisman) and made its film festival debut in October 2007 at the Woodstock Film Festival. In the film Sebastian humorously explains (with musical accompaniment) how his song, "Younger Girl", was inspired by Gus Cannon's "Prison Wall Blues."

Sebastian's live performances in the 2000s have included performing as a trio with country blues duo Paul Rishell and Annie Raines in 2002; touring with Maria Muldaur and her Garden of Joy jug band in 2009; and occasional appearances with mandolinist David Grisman, with whom Sebastian played in the Even Dozen Jug Band in the 1960s and more recently collaborated on a CD album release, Satisfied.

Record releases
After leaving Reprise, Sebastian continued to occasionally release CD albums through a variety of small labels. Although a number of these releases consisted of compilations or live performances of his older material from the 1960s and 1970s, some, such as Tar Beach (Shanachie, 1993) and Satisfied (with David Grisman) (Acoustic Disc, 2007) have contained significant new recordings. Tar Beach in particular contained eleven previously unreleased songs written or co-written by Sebastian; four songs were composed by the team of Sebastian and songwriter Phil Galdston, with whom Sebastian also collaborated on the score for the Sig Shore-directed feature film The Act (1984). According to Colin Larkin, Sebastian had written many of the songs that appeared on Tar Beach more than a decade prior to the album's release. Two later releases, I Want My Roots (Music Masters, 1996) and Chasin' Gus' Ghost (Hollywood, 2000), focused on Sebastian's work with the J-Band.

Soundtrack work
Sebastian is a frequent contributor to film and TV soundtracks.  In particular, he has written and performed music for a number of children's films and TV productions.  He wrote the music and provided the singing voice of "Daniel Mouse" for the Canada-based Nelvana animated television special The Devil and Daniel Mouse (1978) about two mice attempting to succeed in the music business. He supplied music for several more Nelvana productions, including Strawberry Shortcake: Housewarming Surprise (1983), Strawberry Shortcake Meets the Berrykins (1985), The Care Bears Movie (1985), The Care Bears Adventure in Wonderland (1987), and "Care Bear Countdown", the theme song for Nelvana's The Care Bears Family TV series.  He also wrote and sang the theme song/narration for Nelvana's TV pilot The Get Along Gang; however, none of it was kept when DIC Entertainment took over the project. He wrote and performed the theme song of the KNBC syndicated children's program That's Cat (1976–1979), and hosted a 1986 Disney Channel family special entitled What a Day for a Daydream.

Television presenter
Since the 1980s, Sebastian has hosted several television programs about 1960s and 1970s music, including paid programs for compilation sets, a syndicated live music and interview program called Deja View, and a half-hour program called The Golden Age of Rock and Roll, which featured video footage of 1960s bands performing on variety shows. He also hosted a Lovin' Spoonful retrospective broadcast on PBS in March 2007, talking about various Spoonful numbers in between vintage video clips of the band up to the time he left.

Children's book author
In 1993, Sebastian authored a children's book, JB's Harmonica, illustrated by his godfather Garth Williams, about a young bear whose musical aspirations are overshadowed by the talents of his famous musician father.

Instructor at Homespun Tapes
Sebastian has released a series of instructional DVDs, CDs, downloads, booklets, and (prior to the use of digital media) analog tapes for learning to play guitar, harmonica, and autoharp, or for learning specific styles or songs. These instructional materials are distributed by Homespun Tapes, a company founded and operated by folk musician Happy Traum. Materials offered with Sebastian as an instructor have included An Easy Guide to Tuning Your Guitar, John Sebastian Teaches Eight Lovin' Spoonful Hits (and "Welcome Back"), John Sebastian Teaches Blues Harmonica, Learn to Play Autoharp, and The Fingerpicking Blues of Mississippi John Hurt: A Spoonful of Classic Songs.

Other appearances and activities

In November 1992, Sebastian made a cameo appearance on the sitcom Married... with Children (Season 7, Episode 9, "Rock of Ages") as himself, along with other 1960s rock stars Spencer Davis, Richie Havens, Robby Krieger, Mark Lindsay, and Peter Noone.

Sebastian appeared on Eels' 2005 release, Blinking Lights and Other Revelations.

On January 12, 2014, Sebastian appeared on CBS News Sunday Morning to talk about his career with and without the Lovin' Spoonful, Eric Clapton, and the Martin guitar.

In 2016, Sebastian appeared on Richard Barone's Sorrows & Promises: Greenwich Village in the 1960s album, playing harmonica, autoharp and making a vocal cameo on Barone's cover of the Lovin' Spoonful song "Did You Ever Have to Make Up Your Mind?".

Influence and legacy

Sebastian is a notable songwriter whose work has been covered by many artists, including Elvis Costello ("The Room Nobody Lives In"), Johnny Cash ("Darlin' Companion"), and Del McCoury ("Nashville Cats"). Several songs have also spawned multiple covers, including:
 "Lovin' You" – covered by Dolly Parton, Helen Reddy, and Bobby Darin;
 "Stories We Could Tell" – covered by The Everly Brothers, Tom Petty, and Jimmy Buffett;
 "Darlin' Be Home Soon" – covered by Joe Cocker, The Association, Slade, Cass Elliot, Bruce Hornsby, Allison Crowe, and others.

Sebastian is also credited with helping to popularize the art of tie-dyeing clothing among music fans and festival goers in the late 1960s, by publicly appearing in outfits that he tie-dyed himself after learning the process from Ann Thomas of Water Baby Dye Works."The Psychedelic Tie-Dye Look", Time Magazine, January 26, 1970, p. 38. His tie-dyed yellow patterned denim jacket, which he dyed himself and wore at Woodstock, has been prominently displayed in the Rock and Roll Hall of Fame.Stories We Could Tell, the title of a novel by British writer Tony Parsons, comes from the Sebastian song of the same name.

Awards and honors
As an original member of the Lovin' Spoonful, Sebastian was inducted into the Rock and Roll Hall of Fame in 2000.

He was also inducted into the Songwriters Hall of Fame in 2008.

Personal life

Sebastian has been married three times. His first wife was Jean "Butchie" Webber (later known as Butchie Denver after she married actor Bob Denver). According to Steve Boone, Butchie was an early supporter and friend of the Lovin' Spoonful's who secretly married Sebastian in the early 1960s to reduce his chances of being drafted for service in the Vietnam War. The couple divorced in 1966. That same year, Sebastian married Loretta "Lorey" Kaye, a waitress at Steve Paul's The Scene who later worked for Hit Parader magazine; they divorced in 1968.Heil, Jane, "Rock, Roll and Me: Writing the '60s", forumworldcultures.blogspot.com, July 20, 2008. Retrieved June 3, 2015.

In 1972, Sebastian married Catherine Barnett, a photographer and artist who has designed numerous album covers. The couple have two children together.Torres, Agnes, "Musical Variety Spices John Sebastian's Life," Orlando Sentinel, orlandosentinel.com, July 27, 1986. Retrieved June 3, 2015.

Since the early 1990s, Sebastian has struggled with throat problems that eventually affected and changed his singing voice, but he has continued to perform and tour.Brend, Mark. American Troubadours: Groundbreaking Singer Songwriters of the 60s. Backbeat Books, 2001, p. 172. .

Solo discography

Original U.S. singles

Original Studio and Live Albums

Selected Reissues, Compilations, and Archival Live Albums
Much of Sebastian's material, especially his 1970s Reprise albums and the 1996 King Biscuit Flower Hour'' live recording, has been reissued and/or repackaged many times; therefore, this table is selective. Sebastian has also released various formats and packages of long-playing instructional materials for Homespun Tapes, which are not included in this table.

Contributions to "various artists" albums
This table lists songs written or performed by Sebastian that were originally released on — and in many cases, are only available on — compilations or collaborations of various artists, including but not limited to soundtrack albums. Contributions as a guest on albums released under the name of a specific artist or group are not included.

References

External links
 
 Illustrated Even Dozen Jug Band discography
 Peter Reilly's review of The Four of Us
 Chasin' Gus' Chost jug band documentary

 Interview at classicbands.com
John Sebastian Interview - NAMM Oral History Library (2016)

1944 births
20th-century American singers
21st-century American singers
American country harmonica players
American folk singers
American folk guitarists
American male guitarists
American blues harmonica players
American harmonica players
American blues guitarists
American male singer-songwriters
American musical theatre composers
American musical theatre lyricists
American rock guitarists
American rock songwriters
American rock singers
American people of Italian descent
Eels (band) members
Folk musicians from New York (state)
Living people
People from Greenwich Village
Rock harmonica players
Singers from New York City
The Lovin' Spoonful members
American autoharp players
Blair Academy alumni
Reprise Records artists
Guitarists from New York City
20th-century American guitarists
21st-century American guitarists
Even Dozen Jug Band members
Singer-songwriters from New York (state)